Indiana University Health Arnett Hospital is a leading, full-service, private, nonprofit hospital, located in Lafayette, Indiana, part of the Indiana University Health system. The hospital was the first in Indiana with an ACS verified Level III Trauma Center. IU Health Arnett Hospital is a Level III NICU with 12 beds staffed by four neonatologists with 24 hour coverage by Neonatal Nurse Practitioners.

History
The 350,000-sq ft acute care hospital officially broke ground in 2006. In October 2008 Clarian Arnett Hospital officially opened for business. Clarian Arnett Hospital formed from a joint venture between Clarian Health Partners and Arnett HealthSystem. In January 2011 Clarian Arnett Hospital changed its name to Indiana University Health Arnett Hospital to reflect their affiliation with the IU school of medicine.
In February 2015 IU Health Arnett Hospital started an $18 million expansion to add 100 patient exam rooms, three stories, and 75,000-sq ft to the facility. This new facility will include physicians' clinic offices, including OBGYN, orthopedics, and surgeons. The project was completed in 2016.

Leadership
Daniel Neufelder became president of IU Health West Central Region in May, 2018 succeeding Donald Clayton M.D.

Recognition
IU Health Arnett is rated high performing in adult colon cancer surgery and in adult heart failure. In June 2019 the National Committee for Quality Assurance (NCQA) announced that IU Health Arnett has been awarded NCQA Patient-Centered Medical Home (PCHM) recognition.

References

Hospitals in Indiana
Indiana University
Lafayette metropolitan area, Indiana
Hospital buildings completed in 2008
Buildings and structures in Lafayette, Indiana
Hospitals established in 2008